Shadowlands, also known as C.S. Lewis: Shadowlands and C.S. Lewis Through the Shadowlands, is a 1985 television film written by William Nicholson, directed by Norman Stone and produced by David M. Thompson for BBC Wales. The film is about the relationship between Oxford don and author C. S. Lewis and the American writer Joy Davidman. It stars Joss Ackland as Lewis, with Claire Bloom as his wife Joy Davidman.

Synopsis
Oxford professor, world-renowned writer and confirmed bachelor C.S. Lewis (Joss Ackland) finds himself famed and admired from the success of his recently published series of Narnia books for children. One day, Lewis receives a captivating letter from an American woman, New York divorcée: Joy Gresham (Claire Bloom). A mother of two boys, Gresham strikes up a correspondence with Lewis, who over time finds himself falling in love with the writer. Gresham moves to England with her two boys, Douglas and David (Rupert Baderman, Rhys Hopkins), and marries Lewis; who becomes their stepfather. All seems to be a perfect life and marriage for the happy family until Joy is suddenly struck down by cancer and dies. Devastated by this loss, Lewis struggles with his Christian beliefs and begins to challenge his own faith and relationship with God.

History
Shadowlands began life as a script entitled I Call it Joy written for Thames Television by Brian Sibley and Norman Stone. Sibley was credited on the BBC film as "consultant" and went on to write the book C.S. Lewis Through the Shadowlands: The Story of His Life with Joy Davidman (1994). The made-for-television film won BAFTA Awards in 1986 for Best Play and Best Actress (Bloom). Following their roles in Shadowlands, Ackland and Bloom went on to star opposite each other in several other films including: Queenie (1987), Mad Dogs and Englishmen (1995) and Tales from the Madhouse (2000).

The original 1985 film ran for 92 minutes; but an alternate version was produced in 1994 for home video titled: "C.S. Lewis: Shadowlands", which ran for 73 minutes, cutting several scenes and including on-screen titles. A DVD version was released in 2013 re-titled: "C.S. Lewis Through the Shadowlands" with the original 90 minute running time.

Screenwriter William Nicholson adapted a stage version of the 1985 TV movie which premiered at the Theatre Royal in Plymouth on October 5, 1989. The production later went on to the Queen's Theatre in London before transferring to Broadway at the Brooks Atkinson Theatre on November 11, 1990 where it received a Tony Award at the 45th Tony Awards on June 2, 1991 for Best Actor (Nigel Hawthorne as Lewis).

The success of the stage play lead Nicholson to adapt it once again for a feature film: Shadowlands starring Anthony Hopkins and Debra Winger which was released in 1993.

See also
 Through the Shadowlands: The Love Story of C. S. Lewis and Joy Davidman by Brian Sibley, Revell (July 1, 2005) 
 A Grief Observed by C.S. Lewis, Bennett Books Ltd (1985)

References

External links
 

1985 television films
1985 films
1985 in England
English films
British television films
British biographical films
BBC television dramas
BBC Cymru Wales television shows
International Emmy Award for Drama winners
University of Oxford in fiction
Films set in Oxford
C. S. Lewis
Cultural depictions of C. S. Lewis
1980s British films